FK Polimlje is a football club based in Prijepolje, Serbia. They currently compete in the West Morava Zone League, the fourth tier of the national league system.

History
Founded in 1926, the club participated in the Second League of FR Yugoslavia for two seasons between 1996 and 1998.

Honours
Zlatibor District League (Tier 5)
 2008–09

Notable players
National team players
  Ivica Dragutinović
  Mihajlo Pjanović
For a list of all FK Polimlje players with a Wikipedia article, see :Category:FK Polimlje players.

Managerial history

References

External links
 Club page at Srbijasport

1926 establishments in Serbia
Association football clubs established in 1926
Football clubs in Serbia
Prijepolje